Myctophum asperum, common name the prickly lanternfish, is a species of deep sea fish in the family Myctophidae, the "lanternfish".

Description

Distribution
Myctophum asperum is found in the following regions:

Western Atlantic Ocean from 20° north to Brazil, and also occurs in the Gulf of Mexico.
Eastern Atlantic Ocean, occurring from Mauritania to South Africa in the Agulhas water pockets.
Northwest Atlantic near Canada.
Indo-Pacific in both the following currents:
North and south equatorial currents
Equatorial countercurrents
East Australian and Agulhas currents
Eastern Central Pacific.
South China Sea and East China Sea

Larvae have also been found in the Taiwan Strait.

Habitat
This species is found at depths of between 425 and 750 metres during the day. At night it can ascend to depths of 125 metres to feed on plankton.

Synonyms
Dasyscopelus asper (Richardson, 1845)
Dasyscopelus naufragus Waite, 1904
Scopelus asper (Richardson, 1845)

References

External links
 Photo of specimen

Myctophidae
Taxa named by John Richardson (naturalist)
Fish described in 1845